Sino-Portuguese architecture, also known as Chinese Baroque, Straits/Singapore Eclectic architecture or Peranakan architecture is an Asian hybrid style incorporating elements of both Chinese and Portuguese architectural styles. It is common in urban centers where Chinese settlers lived in southern China and the Peranakans of the Malay Peninsula, with examples found and most prominently conserved and maintained in Singapore.

Historical areas with such architecture can also be found throughout Malay Peninsula, Southern Thailand (primarily Phuket), Macau, Vietnam and Hainan (primarily Haikou). In many of these places however, such structures has either be demolished or are in a state of disrepair.

Sino-Portuguese style 
The characteristics of Sino-Portuguese architecture is a mix of European and Chinese styles or simply colonial architecture. These older buildings were built by the Chinese coolies. The building has the design (painting) in Chinese format, but the structure is Portuguese. Typically, the building is a one or two storey mixed commercial-residential building. The wall has strength due to the weight of the tiles on the roof. The roof is clad in curved tiles of Chinese provenance.

In contemporary Singapore, such structures are conserved and maintained regularly, making them a huge tourist attraction for foreigners unacquainted with such structures. Its historical heritage as well as its location in the city-centre also makes them highly valuable.

Sino-Portuguese history in Phuket
The old town in Phuket has a history as the center of a tin mining and trading province. In the era of Western imperialism, after 1511 (2054 BE), Portuguese settlers came to Phuket and to the trade port of Malacca. The settlers brought Western culture with them, as well as science, religion, and their own architectural styles. Portuguese settlers employed Chinese workers to build their houses and establishments. These structures mixed Portuguese and Chinese art styles together, giving rise to Sino-Portuguese architecture.

Gallery

See also 

 Architecture of Singapore
 Bahay na Bato
 Malay houses
 Nipa hut
 Rumah adat
 Shophouse
 Tong lau

References

External links 
 Old Phuket Houses. Retrieved 3 October 2016, from www.phuket.com
 Phuket's Old Town Movement. Retrieved 3 October 2016, from lestariheritage.net
 Sino-Portuguese Architecture. Retrieved 3 October 2016, from www.roughguides.com

Architectural styles
Architecture in Thailand
Architecture in Singapore
Architecture in Malaysia
Singaporean culture
Portuguese colonial architecture
Portuguese diaspora in Thailand
Buildings and structures in Phuket province